Květoslav (feminine: Květoslava) is a Slavic origin name derived from the words "květ" – flower, and "sláva" – glory. Diminutive form: Květa, Květo.

The name is known mostly in the Czech Republic and Slovakia, though its feminine forms (Kwietosława and Kwiatosława) as well as their diminutive (Kwieta) also rarely appear in Poland.

People
Květa Jeriová, Czech cross country-skier
Květoslav Minařík, Czech yogi and mystic
Květoslav Svoboda, Czech freestyle swimmer

Places
 Kvetoslavov - a small village in western Slovakia

Slavic masculine given names
Czech masculine given names